Platter may refer to:
Platter (album), by Jock Cheese
Platter (dinner), a meal of several components served together on a platter or in a basket
Platter (dishware), large dish used for serving food
Platter (horse), American Champion racehorse
Platter, Oklahoma, U.S.
Hard disk drive platter, part of a computer hard drive
A platter lift, a mechanized system for pulling skiers and snowboarders uphill
The Platters, an American vocal group

People with the surname
Bruno Platter (1944–), Grand master of the Teutonic Order
Luanne Platter, fictional character in the animated series King of the Hill
Thomas Platter (1499–1582), humanist scholar and writer
Thomas Platter the Younger (c.1574 – 1628), Swiss-born physician, traveller and diarist

See also
 Plater (surname)